Lyssa Drak is an alien supervillainess published by DC Comics. First appearing in Green Lantern vol. 4 #18 (May 2007), she was created by Geoff Johns and Dave Gibbons.

Fictional character biography
Little is known about the enigmatic Lyssa Drak except that she is from Talok IV, one of the three inhabitable worlds in the Talokian star system in Sector 3500 that Lydea Mallor (Talok VIII), Lyrissa Mallor (Talok VIII), Shadow Lass (Talok VIII) and Mikaal Tomas (Talok III) hail from. How she came to be a member of the Sinestro Corps, which is based in the anti-matter universe on the planet of Qward, is unknown, though it can be assumed she was recruited by Sinestro himself.

Drak is also involved in the training of prospective Sinestro soldiers. Once a corpsmen has finished the physical training and was judged by Arkillo, the Sinestro Corps drill sergeant, to be ready for the next phase of training, the new recruit would have their yellow power ring drained of energy and they would enter a Fear Lodge. Within the dark confines of the Fear Lodge, the recruit would have to face their fears and embrace them in order to recharge their ring. If a recruit succeeded, their ring would open the Fear Lodge. If the recruit failed, they would be left inside to die, either from thirst, starvation, suffocation, or suicide. Whatever the recruit's fate, Lyssa Drak was there to record their success or failure in the Book of Parallax. For reasons unknown, this tome, which holds the stories of the greatest Sinestro Corpsmen and tells stories of Despotellis, Karu-Sil, and Bedovian, was chained to Lyssa Drak with yellow energy from Sinestro himself. This was possibly for the need to have a historian for his Corps and a way for Sinestro to revisit his Corps' success. Lyssa Drak is quite loyal to Sinestro and highly devoted to updating the book and keeping it safe.

Aside from recording the history of the Sinestro Corps, Lyssa Drak also seems to have some insight as to what will take place for her corps as well. Whether this is actual knowledge of the future or simply plans intended by Sinestro remains to be seen.

When introducing herself to Amon Sur, Drak hinted that she had the ability to sense the feelings of others. Lyssa Drak presided over Amon Sur's initiation and helped prepare him for his time in the Fear Lodge. Amon had approached Lyssa for help to purge his fear. Instead, Lyssa read from the Book of Parallax stories of other Sinestro Corps members. Afterwards, Amon entered the Fear Lodge, learned his greatest fear is the Green Lantern Hal Jordan, and successfully ignited the charge in his ring.

Sinestro Corps War
When the Sinestro Corps waged war on the Green Lantern Corps, Green Lanterns John Stewart and Guy Gardner were captured and Lyssa was charged with overseeing their captivity. Hal Jordan, along with fellow Lanterns Graf Toren and Tomar Tu, came to the rescue. Lyssa Drak was grateful for the chance to defeat the three Lanterns, for she wanted to add her own success to the pages of the Book of Parallax. Drak was defeated herself, and she and the book were placed under Green Lantern custody.

While kept in a lantern-powered cage for a time by the married couple Matoo and Amnee Pree, Drak terrifies them with a tale of Kryb, the Yellow Lantern who targets Green Lantern parents, killing them and taking their children. Lyssa frightens the pregnant Amnee with the prediction that Kryb will come for their child on the day it is born. This prompts the couple to take Lyssa back to Oa and a sciencell prison ahead of schedule as Matoo and Amnee decide to lead the hunt for Kryb.

Blackest Night
She is later seen imprisoned on Oa along with several other members of the Sinestro Corps. Several members of the Green Lantern Corps have tried to interrogate her following her capture, but she inevitably tells them a story about her fellow Sinestro Corps members rather than share her secrets. She was awaiting trial on Oa when Scar, the Black Guardian, released the Red Lantern Corps member Vice in the sciencells to provoke a massive riot. In the melee, Lyssa is freed and reunited with her ring. She claims that she can once again feel the Book of Parallax. While trying to find her precious book, Lyssa discovered instead the Guardian Scar's "Book of the Black" and hastily attempted to claim it as her own, but she didn't notice Scar's presence and was almost immediately sealed inside the book, looking out of it in horror as Scar turned the page, remarking "I hope you enjoy the view from in there".

Brightest Day
Following Scar's death Ganthet and Guy Gardner discovered the Book of the Black, with Lyssa still trapped within. Guy took a moment to mock Lyssa's predicament before closing the book. Lyssa is forced to watch every moment of the Blackest Night over and over again as she reveals her greatest fear, which is of the unknown. While lamenting her fate, she is pulled out of the book by the mysterious foe currently capturing the emotional entities. Lyssa is able to recognize the robed stranger, who informs her that her assistance is required since another book will soon be made and a keeper is needed.

Feeling betrayed and abandoned by her fellow corpsmembers after the events of Blackest Night, Lyssa defected from the Sinestro Corps and was later revealed to be the keeper of the Book of the Black. After launching her attack on her former leader, Sinestro, and the "New Guardians" she is capable of trapping Sinestro himself, Carol Ferris, Atrocitus, Larfleeze, Saint Walker and Indigo-1 inside the book. However, Sinestro was able to prevent her from capturing Hal Jordan as well by causing a detonation combining the energy of their rings, but the energy explosion also affected the Book of the Black, which disappeared in a rainbow light, leaving only behind the rings of the six trapped lanterns.

The New 52
Following the War of the Green Lanterns storyline, Lyssa Drak is confronted by the now Green Lantern Sinestro who tracked her with the aid of Starstorm, an energy-manipulating alien hero he fought while in the Sinestro Corps, whose contact with the Book of the Black reveals the Guardians' plan to replace the Corps with the 'Third Army'. Lyssa Drak told the Guardians of the Universe that they can help her get the Book of Parallax, while she was trapped in the Sciencell. She became a member of the Sinestro Corps and escaped the Sciencell when Sinestro became a member of the Sinestro Corps.

Powers and abilities
While Lyssa herself is an extremely skilled fighter, an expert survivalist, and learns new things very quickly, as a member of the Sinestro Corps Lyssa possessed a yellow power ring which allowed its wielder to create constructs in the form of whatever objects its bearer can imagine. The power rings also provide flight, force fields and communication.

In other media

Film
 Lyssa Drak, alongside the rest of the Sinestro Corps, appears in the animated film Green Lantern: Emerald Knights.
 Lyssa Drak appears in Green Lantern: Beware My Power, voiced by Mara Junot.

Video games
 Lyssa Drak makes multiple appearances in DC Universe Online. In the villains campaign, the players help Sinestro raid Oa in order to release the Green Lantern Corps' most dangerous villains where they end up having to retrieve Lyssa Drak from an emerald-powered prison. She appears in the hero campaign in Oa where heroes have to battle yellow light constructs, and then Lyssa (a sub boss) and also appears in other raids and alerts throughout the game.

References

External links
 DCU Guide: Lyssa Drak
 Wizard Article on the members of the Sinestro Corps
 Newsarama Tapping in to Evil: Ethan Van Sciver on Sinestro Corps

Characters created by Dave Gibbons
Characters created by Geoff Johns
DC Comics aliens
DC Comics extraterrestrial supervillains
DC Comics female supervillains
Comics characters introduced in 2007